is a retired Japanese hurdler who specialized in the 400 metres hurdles. He is the Asian best performer in the rarely-contested 300 metres hurdles.

He is currently the director of track and field club at Josai University. He married Japanese hurdler Satomi Kubokura in April 2013.

Personal bests

International competitions

References

External links

Yoshihiro Chiba at JAAF 

1979 births
Living people
Japanese male hurdlers
Sportspeople from Saitama Prefecture
Competitors at the 2001 Summer Universiade
Juntendo University alumni
Japanese athletics coaches